As an element of architecture, a laylight is a glazed panel usually set flush with the ceiling for the purpose of admitting natural or artificial light. Laylights typically utilize stained glass or lenses in their glazing. A laylight differs from a glazed (or closed) skylight in that a skylight functions as a roof window or aperture, while a laylight is flush with the ceiling of an interior space. When paired with a roof lantern or skylight on a sloped roof, a laylight functions as an interior light diffuser. Before the advent of electric lighting, laylights allowed transmission of light between floors in larger buildings, and were not always paired with skylights.

See also
 Daylighting
 Pavement light
 Prism lighting

References 

Lighting
Windows
Energy-saving lighting
Solar architecture